The 1988 Torneo Descentralizado, the top tier of Peruvian football was played by 37 teams in the format of Regional Tournaments. The national champion was Sporting Cristal.

Torneo Regional

Metropolitan

Group A

Group B

North

Central

South

Liguilla Regional

Torneo Descentralizado "B"

North

Central

Metropolitan

South

Final group

Torneo Descentralizado

Liguilla

Championship Match

Title

External links
Peru 1988 season at RSSSF
Peruvian Football League News 

1988
Peru
1988 in Peruvian football